Jordan Bolger (born 9 November 1994) is an English actor. He has performed in television notably in Peaky Blinders, The 100 and The Book of Boba Fett. In film, he is known for side roles in Tom & Jerry and The Woman King.

Early life and education 
Bolger was born in Radford, England to a Jamaican father and English mother, and has a brother Daniell. He was brought up by his single mother Liz who is a gym instructor. He did taekwondo and kickboxing as a youth. He trained as a dancer at the Tring Park School for the Performing Arts.

Career
Originally intending to be a professional dancer, Bolger injured himself at a dancing audition and decided to audition as an actor instead. His first acting role was as Isaiah Jesus in the British period crime drama television series Peaky Blinders. He made 13 appearances in the show from 2014 to 2017, before exiting the show due to clashing schedules. In 2018, he appeared on the post-apocalyptic science fiction drama The 100 cast as Miles Ezekial Shaw. In 2021, he made his Hollywood debut in a side role in the comedy film Tom & Jerry. 
In 2022, he was cast as the recurring character Skad in the Star Wars spinoff television series The Book of Boba Fett. He appeared in the supporting role, Malik, in the acclaimed 2022 film The Woman King.

Filmography

Film

Television

Notes

References

External links
 
 

1994 births
Living people
Actors from Coventry
Black British male actors
21st-century English actors
English film actors
English television actors
English people of Jamaican descent
People educated at Tring Park School for the Performing Arts